Dharmarāja Adhvarin (b. 17th century C.E., Khandaramanikkam, Tanjor, India) was a Hindu philosopher. He developed the Advaita theory of knowledge. Up to this point metaphysics  and epistemology were treated as one in Indian philosophy.

References 

Epistemologists
Year of death unknown
17th-century Hindu philosophers and theologians
17th-century Indian philosophers
Scholars of Hinduism
Year of birth unknown
People from Thanjavur district
Scholars from Tamil Nadu